The División de Honor de Hockey Hierba Femenino is the top level of women's field hockey in Spain. It was established in 1933 as Primera División changing its name to current División de Honor in 1986. It's managed by the Real Federación Española de Hockey.

Competition

Format
Competition format changes for 2013–14 season. The competition it divides in three stages; regular season, 2nd stage and playoffs. Regular season comprises 11 matchdays played from October to March through a one-leg format. When regular season finish, table splits into two groups of 6 teams each; in Group 1, top four teams qualify for final stage, while in the Group B, bottom three teams are relegated to Primaera División. Points during regular season/2nd stage are awarded as follows:

2 points for a win
1 points for a draw

History

Champions by season
 As Primera División: 

 As División de Honor: 

 As Liga Iberdrola:

Titles by team

See also
Copa de la Reina de Hockey Hierba

External links
 Real Federación Española de Hockey

 

 
1933 establishments in Spain
Sports leagues established in 1933
Spain